A Mystery for Mr. Bass is a 1960 children's science fiction novel by Canadian author Eleanor Cameron. The novel followed The Wonderful Flight to the Mushroom Planet (1954), Stowaway to the Mushroom Planet (1956), Mr. Bass's Planetoid (1958), and it was illustrated by Leonard Shortall.

Plot summary

After a record-breaking storm, David and Chuck discover half-million-year-old fossils on the cliffs near their homes where no such bones should be, prompting Tyco Bass to reveal some of the history and customs of the Mycetians, the Mushroom People of Earth. After Tyco's departure, the boys' discovery of the ailing Prewytt Brumblydge's unexpected Mycetian connections leads them to attempt a new, unscheduled trip to Basidium.

See also
Jewels from the Moon and the Meteor That Couldn't Stay, the sequel volume to this story.

1960 Canadian novels
1960 science fiction novels
Canadian science fiction novels
Children's science fiction novels
Space exploration novels
Novels by Eleanor Cameron
Works set on fictional moons
Little, Brown and Company books
1960 children's books